Inke Arns (born 1968 in Duisdorf/Bonn) is a German curator and theorist known for her works focusing on media arts.

After having held positions at the Humboldt University of Berlin, Hochschule für Grafik und Buchkunst Leipzig, Hochschule für Gestaltung und Kunst (HGK) in Zürich and Piet Zwart Institut in Rotterdam, she has been the artistic director of Hartware MedienKunstVerein since 2005, a contemporary art space in Dortmund, Germany. She has curated numerous exhibitions, particularly in the field of media art. Her publications include studies of the Slovenian NSK movement.

Education 
She lived in Paris from 1982 to 1986, and studied Russian literature, Eastern European studies, political science, and art history in Berlin and Amsterdam from 1988 to 1996. She obtained a PhD from Humboldt University Berlin in 2004.

Exhibitions 
In 2014, she curated the exhibition Böse Clowns, which presents examples from advertisement, political activism, television and film, pop music and contemporary art.

In 2017, she created the exhibition "alien matter".

Publications
Arns, I. (2002). Netzkulturen, Hamburg: Europäische Verlagsanstalt. 

Arns, Inke (2015). "World of Matter", Berlin: Sternberg Press.

References

External links 
 Dr. Inke Arns / Artistic Director Hartware MedienKunstVerein
 Inke Arns PACT Zollverein (in German)

Living people
1968 births
German art curators
Academic staff of the Hochschule für Grafik und Buchkunst Leipzig
Mass media people from Bonn
German women curators